Massimo Cacciari (born 5 June 1944) is an Italian philosopher, politician and public intellectual.

Biography
Born in Venice, Cacciari graduated in philosophy from the University of Padua (1967), where he also received his doctorate, writing a thesis on Immanuel Kant's Critique of Judgment.  In 1985, he became professor of Aesthetics at the Architecture Institute of Venice. In 2002, he founded the Department of Philosophy at the University of Vita-Salute San Raffaele in Milan, where he was appointed Dean of the Department in 2005. Cacciari has founded several philosophical reviews and published essays centered on the "negative thought" inspired by authors like Friedrich Nietzsche, Martin Heidegger and Ludwig Wittgenstein.

In the 1980s, Cacciari also worked with the Italian composer of avant-garde contemporary/classical music Luigi Nono. Nono, a political activist whose music represented a revolt against bourgeois cultural constructs, collaborated with Cacciari, who arranged the philosophical lyrics on such works of Nono's as Das Atmende Klarsein, Io, and the opera Prometeo.

After a brief affiliation with Potere Operaio, a radical left-wing worker's party, Cacciari joined the Italian Communist Party (PCI).  In the 1970s he was responsible for industrial politics for the PCI Veneto section and, in 1976, he was elected to the Italian Chamber of Deputies, where he was a member of the Parliamentary commission for industry (1976–1983).

After the death of Enrico Berlinguer (1984), Cacciari left the Communist Party and switched to more moderate positions, although he never left the centre-left coalition. In 1993 he was elected mayor of Venice, a position he held until 2000. He was also put forth as the future national leader of the coalition, later named The Olive Tree, but his defeat in the 2000 election as governor of the Veneto region made this occasion wane. However, in a surprise move in 2005, Cacciari again ran for mayor of Venice, and was  elected by a slight majority against former magistrate Felice Casson, the very magistrate who years earlier had famously indicted Mayor Cacciari for criminal negligence arising out of the 1996 fire at Venice's La Fenice opera house. Mayor Cacciari was later acquitted of all charges in that case.

Works with English translations
Architecture and Nihilism: On the Philosophy of Modern Architecture, Yale University Press, 1993
The Necessary Angel, State University of New York Press, 1994
Posthumous People: Vienna at the Turning Point, Stanford University Press, 1996
The Unpolitical. Essays on the Radical Critique of Political Reason, Yale University Press, 2009
Europe and Empire: On the Political Forms of Globalization, Fordham University Press, 2016
The Withholding Power. An Essay on Political Theology, Bloomsbury Academic, 2018

External links
 Interview with Massimo Cacciari: “‘I am many’, says Europe. We have to be capable of being many”, Barcelona Metropolis, 2010.

1944 births
Living people
Italian Communist Party politicians
The Democrats (Italy) politicians
Democracy is Freedom – The Daisy politicians
Democratic Party (Italy) politicians
21st-century Italian politicians
Members of the Chamber of Deputies (Italy)
Politicians of Veneto
Mayors of Venice
Writers from Venice
Italian essayists
20th-century Italian philosophers
21st-century Italian philosophers
20th-century Italian politicians
Male essayists
20th-century essayists
21st-century essayists
20th-century Italian male writers
21st-century Italian male writers
Italian male non-fiction writers
Italian philosophers